Ripalta Arpina, 1038 inhabitants as of 31 December 2013, is a comune (municipality) in the Province of Cremona in the Italian region of Lombardy.

Ripalta Arpina borders the following municipalities: Bertonico, Castelleone, Gombito, Madignano, Montodine, Ripalta Cremasca, Ripalta Guerina.

References

Cities and towns in Lombardy